Godthab Gulf, also known as Godthaab Golf, Clavering Fjord, Clavering Sound and Inner Bay, is a fjord in King Christian X Land, East Greenland. Administratively it is part of the Northeast Greenland National Park zone.

History
The bay was named "Godthaab Golf" during the 1929–1930 Expedition to East Greenland by Lauge Koch after expedition ship Godthaab, a 287-ton barquentine built at Sandefjord (Norway) in 1898 and purchased by the Greenland Administration (Grønlands Styrelse).

Geography
Godthab Gulf lies southwest of Clavering Island and north of Cape Stosch and the northern coastline of Hold with Hope.

To the east lie the Finsch Islands, where the fjord widens and becomes Gael Hamke Bay. Loch Fyne fjord has its mouth in the southern and the Copeland Fjord in the northern shore, with Payer Land to the northwest. The Wordie Glacier has its terminus in Wordie Bay, a small bay at the head of the fjord. A. Schmidt Glacier, Nippoldt Glacier and Haussman Glacier are small glaciers flowing north into Wordie Bay from the Norlund Alps.
Hudson Land lies to the southwest and further to the west is Steno Land.

See also
List of fjords of Greenland

References

External links
 The Permian and Eotriassic vertebrate bearing beds at Godthaab gulf (east Greenland)

Fjords of Greenland